Governor Hadley may refer to:

Herbert S. Hadley (1872–1927), 32nd Governor of Missouri
Ozra Amander Hadley (1826–1873), Acting Governor of Arkansas from 1871 to 1873